Robinsonia flavicorpus is a moth in the family Erebidae. It was described by Paul Dognin in 1910. It is found in Guyana and French Guiana.

References

Moths described in 1910
Robinsonia (moth)